John Clennell (1772–1822)  was a journalist.

Biography 
Clennell's father was a hat-manufacturer in Newcastle on Tyne. Intended for the church, Clennell went into the family firm to support his widowed mother; and then manufactured pins. He was unsuccessful in business, and therefore became a teacher.

Clennell moved to Hackney, London in 1816. He was a contributor to the Commercial and Agricultural Magazine, and attracted many supporters while working on a new journal, assisted by the chemist John Sadler. He wrote for Nicholson's Journal, and was editor of the Tradesman.

He was a contributor to Rees's Cyclopædia, but it is not known on what topics he contributed.

Writings 

 Thoughts on the Expediency of disclosing the processes of Manufactories, 1807. This a pamphlet with the texts of two lectures the author gave to the Literary and Philosophical Society of Newcastle upon Tyne.

References

English male journalists
1772 births
1822 deaths
English male non-fiction writers